Avalanche is the fifth album by the English singer-songwriter Thea Gilmore. It was released on 9 September 2003 on the Hungry Dog record label. The album peaked at number 63 on the UK Albums Chart. Uncut magazine ranked Avalanche at number 59 of its "Albums of the Year" for 2003 and said of Gilmore: "You can here her growing in stature with every record she makes."

Track listing
All songs written by Thea Gilmore, except where noted.
"Rags and Bones" – 3:38
"Have You Heard" – 3:26
"Juliet (Keep That in Mind)" – 3:52
"Avalanche" – 4:21
"Mainstream" (Gilmore, Nigel Stonier) – 3:12
"Pirate Moon" – 4:20
"Apparition #13" – 3:27
"Razor Valentine" – 3:46
"God Knows" – 3:49
"Heads Will Roll" – 2:33
"Eight Months" – 5:33
"The Cracks" – 4:49

Reception

The Independent considered the album to be Gilmore taking "the final step to the forefront of British singer-songwriters, with 12 songs that establish her as the most prolific and intelligent wordsmith of her generation". AllMusic's Hal Horowitz gave it four stars, stating the album saw her "moving a bit closer to the mainstream", also calling the songs "some of her best". Adam Sweeting, for The Guardian, also gave it four stars, writing that it saw her "blazing her own path towards classic status as a songwriter". Billboard's Steve Adams called it "an astonishingly literate collection of songs that marks another career leap".

Personnel
 Thea Gilmore – vocals, acoustic guitar, electric guitar, piano, xylophone, melodica, saw
 Nigel Stonier – producer, programming, electric guitar, acoustic guitar, gut string guitar, bass guitar, keyboards, Moog, Wurlitzer, Rhodes, backing vocals
 Robbie McIntosh – electric guitar, National guitar, backing vocals
 Paul Beavis – drums, percussion
 Jo Wadeson – bass guitar
 Dave "Munch" Moore – Hammond organ
 Mike Cave – drums, programming, cymbal
 Dylan Gallagher – programming
 Dave Hull-Denholm – backing vocals
 Freyja Gilmore – backing vocals
 Oliver Kraus – cello
 Ewan Davies – musical box

References

External links
Gilmore's official website
2004 CD Times interview

2003 albums
Thea Gilmore albums